Monte Alto is a census-designated place (CDP) in Hidalgo County, Texas. The population was 1,924 at the 2010 census, up from 1,611 in 2000. It is part of the McAllen–Edinburg–Mission Metropolitan Statistical Area.

Geography
Monte Alto is located at  (26.373686, -97.972377).

Demographics
As of the census of 2000, there were 1,611 people, 419 households, and 367 families residing in the CDP. The population density was 718.3 people per square mile (277.7/km2). There were 470 housing units at an average density of 209.6/sq mi (81.0/km2). The racial makeup of the CDP was 66.29% White, 0.50% Native American, 0.06% Asian, 31.47% from other races, and 1.68% from two or more races. Hispanic or Latino of any race were 96.77% of the population.

There were 419 households, out of which 50.4% had children under the age of 18 living with them, 66.8% were married couples living together, 14.3% had a female householder with no husband present, and 12.2% were non-families. 8.8% of all households were made up of individuals, and 3.1% had someone living alone who was 65 years of age or older. The average household size was 3.84 and the average family size was 4.12.

In the CDP, the population was spread out, with 36.4% under the age of 18, 12.2% from 18 to 24, 27.0% from 25 to 44, 17.2% from 45 to 64, and 7.1% who were 65 years of age or older. The median age was 26 years. For every 100 females, there were 93.4 males. For every 100 females age 18 and over, there were 101.6 males.

The median income for a household in the CDP was $20,313, and the median income for a family was $21,389. Males had a median income of $14,625 versus $15,750 for females. The per capita income for the CDP was $6,747. About 39.5% of families and 41.3% of the population were below the poverty line, including 48.7% of those under age 18 and 52.8% of those age 65 or over.

One of the last unincorporated townships in Hidalgo county.

Education
Monte Alto is served by the Monte Alto Independent School District for grades Kindergarten through 8th. Monte Alto High School Independent School District also serves the town for grades 9-12.

In addition, South Texas Independent School District operates magnet schools that serve the community.

Notable person
Jack Bloomfield, professional baseball player, scout, and coach

References

Census-designated places in Hidalgo County, Texas
Census-designated places in Texas